Vallesia antillana, common name pearl berry or tearshrub, is a flowering shrub that grows in The Bahamas, Greater Antilles, and Key West. A small population has also been found in Everglades National Park. The flowers do not have much fragrance. It is a perennial plant with white flowers and white fruit. It is in the family Apocynaceae.

It has been used in landscaping and thrives in partial sun. The fruit form is a nearly translucent drupe.

References

Rauvolfioideae
Plants described in 1937